Otto Emanuel Andersson (27 April 1879 – 27 December 1969) was a Finnish musicologist.

Andersson studied first at the Helsingfors musikinstitut (now the Sibelius Academy), becoming a teacher there. He studied folklore and music from 1908 onwards, and gained his Ph.D. in 1923 at the University of Helsinki. From 1926 on, he held the Robert Mattsons chair in musicology and folklore at the Åbo Akademi. In 1906, he formed the  Brage Society, dedicated to Finland's Swedish folk music and culture, serving later as the group's chairman and choirmaster.

Andersson founded three music magazines, wrote a variety of valuable essays and collected and arranged traditional Swedish, Finnish and Estonian folk songs and dances. He also served as a contributor to the Svensk uppslagsbok dictionary, producing music-related entries.

Selected works 
Violinists and Dance-tunes Among the Swedish Population of Finland Towards the Middle of the Nineteenth Century. Novello, 1912
Svensk uppslagsbok (Swedish Dictionary). Lund 1929
The bowed-harp: a study in the history of early musical instruments. W. Reeves, 1930
On Gaelic Folk Music from the Isle of Lewis. 1953
Ballad Hunting in the Orkney Islands. Budklaven, 1954
The Shetland Gue, the Welsh Crwth, and the Northern Bowed Harp. 1956

References

External links

 Andersson, Otto in Biografiskt lexikon för Finland 
 Andersson, Otto in Uppslagsverket Finland 

Finnish musicologists
Finnish male composers
Members of the Royal Swedish Academy of Music
Academic staff of Åbo Akademi University
University of Helsinki alumni
1879 births
1969 deaths
20th-century Finnish male musicians
20th-century Finnish educators